The Lone Rider in Cheyenne is a 1942 American Western film directed by Sam Newfield and written by Oliver Drake and Elizabeth Beecher. The film stars George Houston as the Lone Rider, Al St. John as his sidekick "Fuzzy" Jones, and Dennis Moore as Sheriff Smoky Moore, with Ella Neal, Roy Barcroft and Kenne Duncan. The film was released on March 20, 1942, by Producers Releasing Corporation.

This is the eighth movie in the "Lone Rider" series, which spans seventeen films—eleven starring George Houston, and a further six starring Robert Livingston.

Plot
Smoky Moore is riding to Cheyenne to see his stepfather Bill Hastings, whom he has not seen in fifteen years. His father is the town sheriff. Smoky witnesses Dan Blodgett, the town's mayor and Mort Saunders, head of the Cattleman's Association, robbing the bank at night. During the robbery, a guard is killed, and Smoky somehow winds up getting arrested for both the robbery and the murder!  Tom Cameron (The Lone Rider) and his faithful sidekick Fuzzy Jones break their pal Smoky out of the prison, and weeks later, the three of them sneak back into town disguised, and attempt to expose the so-called good upstanding citizens who were really responsible for the crimes.

Cast          
George Houston as Tom Cameron, the Lone Rider
Al St. John as Fuzzy Jones
Dennis Moore as Smoky Moore 
Ella Neal as Betty Tolliver
Roy Barcroft as Mort Saunders, head of the cattleman's union
Karl Hackett as Mayor Dan Blodgett
Jack Holmes as Sheriff Bill Hastings
Kenne Duncan as Walt, the deputy
Lynton Brent as henchman Dirk Larkin
Jack Ingram as henchman Jed Saunders
George Chesebro as henchman Pete Haynes
Milton Kibbee as Joe Carson

See also
The "Lone Rider" films starring George Houston (actor):
 The Lone Rider Rides On (1941)
 The Lone Rider Crosses the Rio (1941)
 The Lone Rider in Ghost Town (1941)
 The Lone Rider in Frontier Fury (1941)
 The Lone Rider Ambushed (1941)
 The Lone Rider Fights Back (1941)
 The Lone Rider and the Bandit (1942)
 The Lone Rider in Cheyenne (1942)
 The Lone Rider in Texas Justice (1942)
 Border Roundup (1942)
 Outlaws of Boulder Pass (1942)

The "Lone Rider" films starring Robert Livingston (actor): 
 Overland Stagecoach (1942)
 Wild Horse Rustlers (1943)
 Death Rides the Plains (1943)
 Wolves of the Range (1943)
 Law of the Saddle (1943)
 Raiders of Red Gap (1943)

References

External links
 

1942 films
American Western (genre) films
1942 Western (genre) films
Producers Releasing Corporation films
Films directed by Sam Newfield
American black-and-white films
1940s English-language films
1940s American films